"Lonely Island" is a song by American singer-songwriter Sam Cooke, released on March 24, 1958 by Keen Records. The song peaked at number 10 on Billboard Hot R&B Sides chart, and also charted within the top 30 of the Billboard Hot 100.

Background
The emphasis of the recording session in which "Lonely Island" was cut was to record ballads. "The sound was pure pop, with the same antiseptic chorus to which [former label Specialty Records owner] Art [Rupe] had so vociferously objected, and whatever the pedigree of the material, or its limitations, Sam carried off the performance without a hint of hesitation, condescension, or awe," said biographer Peter Guralnick.

Charts

References

1958 singles
Sam Cooke songs
Songs written by Sam Cooke
1958 songs
Soul ballads
Keen Records singles